was the nineteenth of the sixty-nine stations of the Nakasendō. It is located in the present-day town of Karuizawa, in the Kitasaku District of Nagano Prefecture, Japan.

History
This post town's name, which roughly translates to "stuck shoes," came about because it was located near the western entrance to the difficult Usui Pass. When there was severe weather, it was impossible for people or animals to pass. Kutsukake-shuku, along with the neighboring Karuisawa-shuku and Oiwake-shuku, was one of the Sengenmi Shuku ("three shallow passes").

In 1951, there was a large fire, which destroyed nearly all of the remaining historical buildings. All that remains of the honjin are a well and a storehouse.

Neighboring post towns
Nakasendō
Karuisawa-shuku - Kutsukake-shuku - Oiwake-shuku

References

Stations of the Nakasendō
Stations of the Nakasendo in Nagano Prefecture